KZTI (105.3 FM, "Radio Lazer") is a Regional Mexican formatted broadcast radio station licensed to Fallon Station, Nevada, serving Reno, Nevada.  KZTI is owned and operated by Lazer Broadcasting.

History
The station, which had flipped from adult standards on September 14, 2015, originally billed itself as "Z-Rock 105.3" until October 9, 2015, when it changed the moniker to "105.3 Rock Hard" as they can not use the "Z-Rock" branding due to Cumulus Media owning the rights to the name (Cumulus also has stations that compete against the Times-Shamrock outlets in Reno). In 2016 it slightly rebranded as "Z105.3 Rock Hard". On August 1, 2017 KZTI changed their format to regional Mexican, branded as "Radio Lazer". (info taken from stationintel.com)

Booster
In addition to the main station, KZTI is relayed by an FM booster to widen its broadcast area.

References

Previous Logo

External links
Radio Lazer 107.7 & 105.3 Facebook

2012 establishments in Nevada
Radio stations established in 2012
ZTI